Wilfred John Wheelton (April 27, 1920 – July 4, 1976) was the 25th mayor of the city of Windsor, Ontario, Canada, from 1965 to 1969.

Before becoming mayor, Wheelton was a lawyer. Following his years as mayor, he was an Ontario Provincial Court judge.  He was an avid gardener who enjoyed the outdoors.  Judge Wheelton, his wife, Margaret, and son, Robert, died in a car accident in 1976 while returning to their home in Windsor from their summer cottage at Invercairn Beach near Sarnia.

References

1920 births
1976 deaths
Accidental deaths in Ontario
Road incident deaths in Canada
Mayors of Windsor, Ontario